Bead embroidery is a type of beadwork that uses a needle and thread to stitch beads to a surface of fabric, suede, or leather.

Bead embroidery is an embellishment that does not form an essential part of a textile's structure.  In this respect, bead embroidery differs from bead weaving, bead crochet, and bead knitting.  Woven, knitted, and crocheted beads may be attached during fabric production, whereas embroidered beads are always added upon finished fabric.

Traditionally, bead embroidery has been used on clothing and decorative textiles.  It may be used in jewelry with the addition of structural supports such as bracelet bands.  Other clothing accessories such as belt buckles and handbags can be embroidered with beads, and household items such as pillows or boxes may be embellished with bead embroidery.  When used with hard surfaces, bead patterns are measured and planned with seam allowances and attached after embroidery by means of glue or epoxy.

History 
Long before the last major ice age, people were making beads from seashells, seeds, and any other materials they could find. Dating to 2500 BC, the tombs of Ur in Iraq contain beadwork made from Lapis Lazuli beads. The beads were sewn into the base.  When archeologists excavated Neolithic burial mounds in Europe they found drawings of crude bone needles. Drawings and paintings from Egypt also show richly embroidered clothes.  Bead embroidery is represented in European history dating back to the Middle Ages, with artwork showing bead embroidered hats and clothing.

Native American beadwork has its origins in the arrival of European colonizers.(Cite Source))  Traditional patterns of the Native Americans already existed, but with the arrival of Europeans, seed beads began to be used and traded.  With the violence of Europeans colonizing America, beading became a way for Native Americans to hold on to their cultural identity. Native Americans used multiple techniques and still continue the tradition today. Peyote stitch was taught to Native Americans by Europeans. Loom beading was the last technique to be invented. Within the Americas, bead embroidery was first used by the Native Americans of the Great Lakes region. Native American bead embroidery is also known as applique beadwork.

Technique
Three basic methods may be used to embroider with beads: individual beads may be sewn directly onto fabric, or several beads may be run through a needle before running through the backing, or else a line of threaded beads may be laid upon a fabric and secured with couching stitches.
Many people use a needle and thread to stitch beads to the fabric, usually a fine needle with a small eye to facilitate easier passage through the small holes in many seed beads, a second technique uses a fine hook to chain stitch thread to the fabric, in Europe this technique is known as Tambour or Luneville embroidery, and is commonly used to bead haute couture garments. In India the work is called Zari or Moochi Aari, or just Aari  and is used on garments and furnishings. A hallmark of Tambour or Luneville embroidery is that the beads are attached on the underside of the fabric and the chain is formed on the top side of the fabric. Whereas in Zari and Aari work the beads are attached to the top side of the fabric where the chain stitch is formed. In Zari/Aari work the thread is hooked through each bead as the stitches are formed.  
The Tambour/Aari beading methods appear more difficult to master for those more used to working with a threaded needle but do have an advantage in speed over stitching beads with a needle, increased speed is possible as the thread is used from the spool so is continuous, there is no need to fasten of, cut new thread, thread the needle, and fasten on, secondly With Tambour/Luneville work the beads are strung direct on the thread before stitching begins, so no time is lost placing each bead on the needle. There are multiple YouTube videos examples demonstrating Arri/Zari stitching, and numerous books which instruct on Tambour or Luneville work.
Most beading onto fabric is worked with the fabric stretched tightly over a frame, this holds the fabric tight and provides a flat surface to work the embroidery on, beads can add significant weight so some support is important.   Using a frame means the embroiderer has both hands free for working.  In Tambour or Luneville work the frame is often supported between two tables, above a table or on trestle supports and used when seated on a chair. In Aari or Zari work the frame is often closer to the ground, and used while seated on the ground.  
Lesage is acclaimed in the fashion world for the beaded embroideries worked for many well known fashion designers.

References

Embroidery
Beadwork